Camp Agawam is a boys' camp located on Crescent Lake in Raymond, Maine, U.S., and is one of the oldest summer camps for boys in the United States. The camp was founded in 1919 by Appleton A. Mason, and remained in the Mason family until 1985. The Boston Globe described the camp in 1988 as "an old camp with old ideas." However, in 2009, Senator Susan Collins described its program as "unique and exciting." It is noted for its award-winning charitable program, Main Idea, which enables underprivileged boys to attend the camp. The camp is run as a non-profit organization, directed by Erik Calhoun.

History 

Camp Agawam was founded in 1919 by Appleton A. Mason, known as "The Governor", an American football player, coach of football and basketball, and physical education instructor. The camp was run by him until his death in 1938, and then taken over by his sons, Appleton Mason, Jr (1939–1956) and David W. Mason (1957–1985). Since David Mason's retirement, it has been managed by Agawam Council, a non-profit organization, whose board is composed of former campers. The camp in the late 1980s was still run along traditional lines, according to Peter Anderson of the Boston Globe, writing in 1988, who calls it "an old camp with old ideas." He describes traditions such as bugle calls for reveille and retreat, when the camp's flag is lowered, candle-lit processions, and former campers being remembered with flat stones and totem poles dating back to 1934.

Camp Program 
The camp is for boys aged eight to fifteen years of age. The season lasts about seven weeks in the summer. The program includes activities such as hiking, fishing, swimming, sailing, archery, and other sports. Throughout the camp season, boys compete in the Ag vs. Wam season. The boys are split into one of two teams, Ag or Wam, of which you are a member for life. The boys compete in all different activities so that one team will prevail. However, their main focus is "leadership and character building that is developed through daily interaction with mentors and peers."

Main Idea Program 
 David Mason and his wife Peg founded the Main Idea program in 1971, a charitable project that sponsors attendance at the camp for disadvantaged boys from southern Maine towns. Mason states: "I wanted to do something for the boys living around here, who see out-of-state campers come and go each year, but think that camp is an experience that will never come their way." By 2005, the program had involved over 2,600 boys, and had gained local and national media coverage. Senator Susan Collins described the initiative in 2009 as "truly a meaningful investment in Maine's most precious resource—our children." As of 2014, the program is offered to over one hundred boys aged 9–15 years annually a free week's camp attendance in June.

Awards 
Main Idea was awarded the American Camp Association's Eleanor P. Eells Award for Program Excellence in 2004/2005, and also was recognized as one of the top summer camps according to Richard Kennedy. Two past camp directors, David Mason and his successor Garth R. Nelson, received Halsey Gulick Awards for their services to the "organized youth camping movement in Maine".

In popular culture 
Camp Agawam is mentioned in two novels set in Maine by Stephen King, Pet Sematary and Dreamcatcher.

Notes

References

External links 
 

Agawam
Buildings and structures in Cumberland County, Maine
Raymond, Maine
Youth organizations established in 1919
1919 establishments in Maine